Le Vieux Nick et Barbe-Noire (literally Old Nick and Blackbeard; formerly Le Vieux Nick) is a Belgian comics series by Marcel Remacle. Set in the 18th century, the series depicts the misadventures of Old Nick, an old sailor, known for his trickery, as he battles his main enemy, Blackbeard.  It was published between 1958 and 1990.

Protagonists

Old Nick, an old sailor. Despite his sickly appearance, his is very fit. A cunning character, he uses his wits and trickery to overcome his enemies, most of the time.
Blackbeard, Old Nick's main foe. Though dreaded by many, he is dumb by nature.
Grandpa, the grandpa of Blackbeard. He has a tendency to slap his grandson. He relies on the use of a walking stick to enable him to walk.
Sebastian, a harpooner. He was discovered in a wrecked ship by Old Nick.

References

Belgian comic strips
1958 comics debuts
Comics characters introduced in 1958
1990 comics endings
Fictional sailors
Fictional pirates
Comic strip duos
Dupuis titles
Nautical comics
Comics set in the 18th century
Pirate comics
Belgian comics characters
Male characters in comics
Cultural depictions of Blackbeard